The Omoeroa River is a river of the West Coast region of New Zealand's South Island. It flows northwest from its source high in the Southern Alps, 14 kilometres north of Aoraki / Mount Cook, reaching the Tasman Sea 12 kilometres west of Franz Josef.

The New Zealand Ministry for Culture and Heritage gives a translation of "place of the long sleep" for Ōmoeroa.

See also
List of rivers of New Zealand

References

Rivers of the West Coast, New Zealand
Westland District
Rivers of New Zealand